Malaysia competed in the 2014 Commonwealth Games in Glasgow, Scotland, from 23 July to 3 August 2014.

Media coverage
Malaysian satellite television provider Astro, public broadcaster Radio Televisyen Malaysia and Media Prima Group private broadcasters TV3 (Sistem Televisyen Malaysia Berhad) and NTV7 (Natseven TV Sdn Bhd) held the broadcast rights of the 2014 Commonwealth Games in the country. This was the only time in 2010's decade Malaysian sports telecast when Radio Televisyen Malaysia (RTM) and Media Prima compete against each other for free-to-air broadcast rights for the event. Radio Televisyen Malaysia would later regain full rights for the 2018 edition as it did in 2010.

Medallists

|  style="text-align:left; width:78%; vertical-align:top;"|

|  style="text-align:left; width:22%; vertical-align:top;"|

Athletics

Men
Field events

Women
Track event

Field event

Badminton

Individual

Doubles

Mixed team

Pool A

Quarterfinals

Semifinals

Final

Boxing

Men

Cycling

Road

Track
Sprint

Time trial

Points race

Scratch race

Keirin

Diving

Men

Women

Gymnastics

Artistic

Men

Women

Rhythmic

Hockey

Men's tournament

Roster

Izwan Firdaus Ahmad Tajuddin
Muhammad Rashid Baharom
Muhammad Razie Abd Rahim (C)
Baljit Singh Charun Singh
Meor Muhamad Azuan Hasan
Muhammad Azri Hassan
Faiz Helmi Jali
Kevin Frederick Lim
Ahmad Kazamirul Nasruddin
Shazril Irwan Nazli
Muhammad Hafizuddin Othman (GK)
Muhamad Ramadan Rosli
Muhammad Shahril Saabah
Muhammad Haziq Samsul
Selvaraju Sandrakasi
Norhizzat Sumantri

Pool B

Seventh and eighth place match

Ranked 7th in final standings

Women's tournament

Roster

Nadia Abdul Rahman (C)
Nuraini Abdul Rashid
Surizan Awang Noh
Norbaini Hashim
Fatin Shafika Mohd Sukri
Nurul Nabihah Mansur
Noor Hasliza Md Ali
Juliani Mohamad Din
Rabiatul Adawiyah Mohamed
Raja Norsharina Raja Shabuddin
Siti Noor Amarina Ruhani
Siti Shahida Saad
Norazlin Sumantri
Fazilla Sylvester Silin
Farah Ayuni Yahya (GK)
Siti Noor Hafiza Zainordin (GK)

Pool B

Seventh and eighth place match

Ranked 7th in final standings

Judo

Men

Women

Lawn bowls

Men

Women

Para-bowls

Rugby sevens

Men's tournament
Malaysia has qualified a rugby sevens team.

Roster

Nazuridin Abd Latiff
Mohd Izwan Abu Bakar
Muhammad Zharif Afandi
Anwarul Hafiz Ahmad
Zulkiflee Azmi
Muhammad Faridzal Ismail
Mohamad Amin Jamaluddin
Marc Le
Mohd Saizul Hafis Md Noor
Muhammad Danial Noor Hamidi
Mohd Syahir Asraf Rosli (C)
Mohd Hafiizh Zainal

Pool C

Bowl
Quarterfinal

Shield
Semifinal

Ranked 15th in final standings

Shooting

Men
Pistol/Small bore

Shotgun

Full bore

Women
Pistol/Small bore

Squash

Individual

Doubles

Swimming

Men

Women

Table tennis

Singles

Doubles

Team

Weightlifting

Men

Women

Powerlifting

References

Nations at the 2014 Commonwealth Games
Malaysia at the Commonwealth Games
2014 in Malaysian sport